Do Raste is a 1961 
Pakistani film directed ghouri malik
produced by Malik Abdul rauf, starting
Bahar Begum, Yousuf Khan, Ejaz Durrani, Neelo, and Talish 
with music by Master Inayat Hussain also known as Inayat Hussain.

Cast
 Bahar Begum
 Yousuf Khan
 Ejaz Durrani
 Neelo
 Talish

Film's Music
The music was composed
by Inayat Hussain  but this film had no 'hit' songs in it.

Film's Reception at the box-office
Do Raste was a big flop film among the Pakistani public.

References

Pakistani drama films
1961 films
1960s Urdu-language films
Pakistani black-and-white films
Urdu-language Pakistani films